Qahar is a 1997 Indian Hindi-language action film directed and produced by Rajkumar Kohli. It stars Sunny Deol, Sunil Shetty, Armaan Kohli, Sonali Bendre, Rambha and Deepti Bhatnagar in pivotal roles.

Cast
Sunny Deol as Raja
Suniel Shetty as Inspector Amar Kapoor
Armaan Kohli as Krishna
Sonali Bendre as Neelam
Deepti Bhatnagar as Sapna
Rambha as Radha
Raj Babbar as Police Commissioner Kapoor
Gulshan Grover as Inspector Maroo
Ramesh Goyal as Inspector
Paresh Rawal as Velji Patel
Kiran Kumar as Nageshwar Patel
Raza Murad as Minister Dharam Chand
Siddhant Salaria as Siddhant Patel, Velji Patel son.
Aruna Irani as Kanta
Rohini Hattangadi as Krishna's mother.
Chandrashekhar Vaidya as Judge

Plot

Amar Kapoor is an honest and diligent police inspector, and the only son of Commissioner Kapoor, assigned to investigate and bring charges against Krishna, and his friend, Raja. During the course of his investigation, he does locate both Krishna and Raja, but discovers that Krishna is his brother, and Raja is involved in fighting the very forces of corruption, namely Velji Patel, his brother Nageshwar Patel, and a corrupt Police Inspector Maroo, who are all responsible for the rape and brutal murder of Neelam, the love of Raja, that he and his dad have a duty to eliminate. Will they join forces to combat the evil-doers or will fate have something else in store for them?

Soundtrack
This was the first time that Rajkumar Kohli collaborated with Anand–Milind, after mostly working with Laxmikant–Pyarelal and Anu Malik. The songs were popular on release, especially Dil Junglee Kabootar and Rab Ke Saamne.

References

External links

1990s Hindi-language films
1997 films
Indian action drama films
Films scored by Anand–Milind